Nagita Slavina Mariana Tengker, (born 17 February 1988) is an Indonesian actress, presenter, singer and businesswoman of mixed Minahasan, Javanese and Minangkabau descent.

.
.
.
.

Personal life
On 17 October 2014, Nagita Slavina married Raffi Ahmad at the age 26. The live broadcast of the wedding for several hours was considered a misuse of the public frequency. The Indonesian Broadcasting Commission (Komisi Penyiaran Indonesia, KPI) gave a written notice to Trans TV about the exclusive broadcast. According to KPI, the duration was too long and the broadcast did not give any benefit to the public as the owner of the frequency.

On 15 August 2015, Nagita Slavina gave birth to a baby boy named Rafathar Malik Ahmad, who has also since appeared in film and on television.

References

1988 births
Living people
Minangkabau people
Minahasa people
Indonesian television personalities
Indonesian television presenters
Indonesian women television presenters
People from Jakarta
Indonesian Muslims